Fußball Club Erzgebirge Aue e.V., commonly known as simply FC Erzgebirge Aue or Erzgebirge Aue, is a German football club based in Aue-Bad Schlema, Saxony. The former East German side was a founding member of the 3. Liga in 2008–09, after being relegated from the 2. Bundesliga in 2007–08. The city of Aue-Bad Schlema has a population of about 20,800, making it one of the smallest cities to ever host a club playing at the second highest level of German football. However, the team attracts supporters from a larger urban area that includes Chemnitz and Zwickau, whose own football sides (CFC and FSV) are among Aue's traditional rivals.

History

1945–1963: East Germany's dominant side

The club was founded as SG Aue in 1945, and on 1 November 1948 became BSG Pneumatik Aue under the sponsorship of the local construction tool works. Changes in sponsorship led to a change in name to BSG Zentra Wismut Aue  in 1949 and then simply to BSG Wismut Aue in 1951.

The club performed well, advancing through third- and second-tier play to the DDR-Oberliga in 1951. BSG Wismut Aue finished as national vice-champions in 1953 losing in a final to SG Dynamo Dresden by a score of 2–3.

The central sports association SV Wismut founded sports club SC Wismut Karl-Marx-Stadt in the nearby city of Chemnitz – recently renamed Karl-Marx-Stadt – in 1954. The East German government urged that Karl-Marx-Stadt deserved a quality football team and plans were made for the football department of BSG Wismut Aue to move to Karl-Marx-Stadt and be incorporated into the new sports club SC Wismut Karl-Marx-Stadt. However, local miners protested and players threatened to strike, leading to a partial abandonment of the plan. The football department of BSG Wismut Aue was still delegated to SC Wismut Karl-Marx-Stadt, but the team would continue to play their matches at the Otto-Grotewohl-Stadion in Aue.

It was during this time that the club became a dominant force in East German football. They won the 1955 East German Cup and followed it up with four DDR-Oberliga titles in 1955, 1956, 1957 and 1959. They also competed in the 1959 East German Cup final, but lost 2–3 in a replay against SC Dynamo Berlin, following the clubs' 0–0 draw in the final. Those successes led to Aues participation in the European Champion Clubs' Cup in 1958, 1959 and 1961.

1963–1991: With the DDR-Oberliga to the end
SC Wismut Karl-Marx-Stadt merged with SC Motor Karl-Marx-Stadt to form SC Karl-Marx-Stadt in 1963. Since SC Motor Karl-Marx-Stadt had brought their own football department, the football department of SC Wismut Karl-Marx-Stadt, once delegated from Aue, got back their independence and could be rejoined with BSG Wismut Aue.

The team continued to enjoy modest success by staying up in the top-tier DDR-Oberliga, and, although it did not win another championship, it holds the record for the most games played by any team in that league. Aue sits 4th on the all-time DDR-Oberliga list and over the course of thirty-eight years played more games (1,019 matches) than any other East German side. Just behind them, 6th place Rot-Weiß Erfurt played 1,001 matches.

BSG Wismut Aue also played in the UEFA Cup tournament in 1985–86 and 1987–88, going out in the first round against Dnipro Dnipropetrovsk in their first appearance and in the second round against Albanian side Flamurtari Vlorë in their second. After German reunification in 1990, the club was renamed FC Wismut Aue before taking on its current name, FC Erzgebirge Aue in 1993. The name "Erzgebirge", Ore Mountains in English, recognizes that the club's home is located in the western part of these mountains. Aue was relegated to the DDR-Liga Staffel B in the 1989–90 season, so it was admitted to the NOFV-Oberliga Süd, which was the fourth tier of the German League between 1991 and 2008, in the 1991–92 season.

1991–2003: Playing in united Germany
In the combined football leagues of the newly united Germany, Aue began playing in the NOFV-Oberliga Süd (IV). They competed in the DFB-Pokal for the first time in 1992. With the establishment of the Regionalliga Nordost (III) in 1994, Aue qualified for the new league. The club was moved to the Regionalliga Nord in 2000, and after a surprising league title there in 2003, they were promoted to the 2. Bundesliga.

2003–present: 2. Bundesliga
Following a Regionalliga Nord title, Erzgebirge Aue were promoted to the 2. Bundesliga where they delivered mid-table performances in their first three seasons, but suffered relegation back to the third tier in 2008.

Aue became part of the new 3. Liga in the 2008 season. They finished runner-up in the league in their second season there, earning promotion back to the 2. Bundesliga. After a fifth-place finish in their first season back, the club struggled against relegation, finishing in the lower third of the table for the following few seasons.

On 6 February 2015, in a 2–0 home victory against RB Leipzig, Aue fans displayed two banners comparing RB Leipzig to Nazis. Aue were fined £25,000 for it and it was ruled that two blocks in their stadium be closed for 12 months. In the 2014–15 season, they were relegated back to the 3. Liga, only to be promoted back to the 2. Bundesliga the following season. The 2016–17 season saw Aue finish 14th, whilst they finished 16th in the 2017–18 season. They finished 14th in the 2018–19 season.

Reserve team
The second team side of Wismut Aue played in the DDR-Liga (II) through the first half of the 1970s and had a single season turn there in 1985–86. They also made more than a half dozen appearances in the early rounds of FDGB Pokal (East German Cup) play between 1968 and 1991.

Since 2008 the club's reserve team, now the FC Erzgebirge Aue II, played in the tier five NOFV-Oberliga Süd with a fifth-place finish in 2014 as its best result. At the end of the 2014–15 season the team was withdrawn from competitive football despite finishing eighth in the league.

The team also made a losing appearance in the 1991 and 2007 Saxony Cup final.

Recent seasons
The recent season-by-season performance of the club:FC Erzgebirge Aue at Fussball.de  Tables and results of all German football leagues

Key

Players
Current squad

Out on loan

Honours

League
 DDR-Oberliga: (as SC Wismut Karl-Marx-Stadt)
 Winners: 1956, 1957, 1959
 Winners of the transition championship: 1955
 3. Liga: Runners-up: 2010, 2016
 Regionalliga Nord (III): Winners: 2003
 Regionalliga Nordost (III): Runners-up: 1997

Cup
 FDGB-Pokal: (as SC Wismut Karl-Marx-Stadt)
 Winners: 1954–55
 Finalists: 1959
 Saxony Cup (Tiers III-VII):'
 Winners: 2000, 2001, 2002, 2016
 Runners-up: 1991‡, 1998, 1999, 2007‡, 2010

 ‡ Denotes achieved by reserve team.

Notable players

Internationals

Coaching history

European record

as SC Wismut Karl-Marx-Stadt

as BSG Wismut Aue

References

External links

 
Football clubs in Germany
Football clubs in East Germany
Football clubs in Saxony
Association football clubs established in 1946
Erzgebirge Aue, Fc
1946 establishments in Germany
Works association football clubs in Germany
Frauen-Bundesliga clubs
2. Bundesliga clubs
3. Liga clubs